Lévy Clément Madinda (born 22 June 1992) is a Gabonese professional footballer who plays as a central midfielder for Malaysian club Negeri Sembilan, on loan from Johor Darul Ta'zim, and the Gabon national team.

Club career

Celta
Born in Libreville, Madinda started playing football for Stade Mandji. In October 2010, after having been spotted by the club during a youth tournament in Burkina Faso, the 18-year-old moved to Spain and signed a five-year contract with Celta de Vigo, going on to remain several seasons registered for the reserves.

Madinda made his official debut with the Galicians' first team on 31 October 2012, playing the full 90 minutes in a 0–2 away loss against Almería for the season's Copa del Rey. He first appeared in La Liga on 30 March of the following year, coming on as a late substitute in a 2–2 home draw to Barcelona.

On 19 January 2016, Madinda renewed his contract until 2018, being immediately loaned to Gimnàstic de Tarragona until June. On 12 July, his loan was extended for a further season, now with a buyout clause.

Asteras Tripoli
In June 2017, Madinda left Balaídos to join Greek side Asteras Tripoli.

Turkey

In September 2020, after leaving Keçiörengücü, he signed for Giresunspor.

Malaysia
In February 2021 he signed for Malaysian club Sabah.
In July 2022, he signed for Malaysian club Johor Darul Ta'zim F.C.

On 16 February 2023, he signed a one-year loan deal with Malaysian club Negeri Sembilan.

International career
Madinda made his debut for Gabon in 2011, and was selected for the 2012 Africa Cup of Nations squad. On 14 November 2012 he scored his first goal as an international, netting the opener in a 2–2 friendly draw with Portugal played in his hometown, through a penalty kick.

In December 2014, Madinda was named as part of Gabon's provisional squad for the 2015 African Cup of Nations.

International goals
 (Gabon score listed first, score column indicates score after each Madinda goal)

Honours
Gabon U23
CAF U-23 Championship:2011

References

1992 births
Living people
Sportspeople from Libreville
Gabonese footballers
AS Stade Mandji players
Celta de Vigo B players
RC Celta de Vigo players
Gimnàstic de Tarragona footballers
Asteras Tripolis F.C. players
Ümraniyespor footballers
Ankara Keçiörengücü S.K. footballers
Giresunspor footballers
Sabah F.C. (Malaysia) players
Segunda División B players
Tercera División players
La Liga players
Segunda División players
Super League Greece players
TFF First League players
Association football midfielders
Gabon international footballers
2012 Africa Cup of Nations players
2015 Africa Cup of Nations players
2017 Africa Cup of Nations players
Olympic footballers of Gabon
Footballers at the 2012 Summer Olympics
Gabonese expatriate footballers
Gabonese expatriate sportspeople in Spain
Expatriate footballers in Spain
Gabonese expatriate sportspeople in Greece
Expatriate footballers in Greece
Gabonese expatriate sportspeople in Turkey
Expatriate footballers in Turkey
Gabonese expatriate sportspeople in Malaysia
Expatriate footballers in Malaysia
21st-century Gabonese people
Johor Darul Ta'zim F.C. players
Negeri Sembilan FC players